The 2020 WWE Draft was the 15th WWE Draft produced by the American professional wrestling promotion WWE between their Raw and SmackDown brand divisions. The two-night event began on the October 9 episode of Friday Night SmackDown and concluded on the October 12 episode of Monday Night Raw. Both shows were broadcast from the WWE ThunderDome, hosted at the Amway Center in Orlando, Florida, with SmackDown airing on FOX and Raw on USA.

Production

Background
The WWE Draft is an annual process used by the American professional wrestling promotion WWE while a brand extension, or brand split, is in effect. The original brand extension occurred from 2002 to 2011, while the second and current brand split began in 2016. During a brand extension, the company divides its roster into brands where the wrestlers exclusively perform for each brand's respective television show, and the draft is used to refresh the rosters of the brand divisions, typically between the Raw and SmackDown brands.

In 2019, the promotion held two drafts, the first in April and the second in October. The one in April, also known as the Superstar Shake-up, had an untraditional drafting format where drafting decisions were made behind the scenes and drafted wrestlers simply appeared on the brand without a major reveal, while the one in October returned to a traditional format, where draft picks were announced on the shows by a WWE official. The 2020 draft was officially announced during the Clash of Champions pay-per-view on September 27 and was scheduled to occur on the October 9 and October 12 episodes of SmackDown and Raw, respectively.

On August 19 during the NXT TakeOver XXX media call, WWE executive and NXT head Triple H said that the 2020 draft would also involve the NXT brand, but the official announcement that occurred during Clash of Champions stated that this draft would only be between Raw and SmackDown. During the NXT TakeOver 31 media call on September 30, a now unsure Triple H stated that he did not know if NXT would be involved. WWE's advertising just a couple days later affirmed that the draft would only be between Raw and SmackDown without NXT involvement. Like previous drafts, wrestlers, including all champions, were eligible to be drafted to either Raw or SmackDown. Due to the stipulations of the titles, holders of the WWE Women's Tag Team Championship and the 24/7 Championship could appear on either show, regardless of the brand they were drafted to, until they lost their respective title.

2020 draft rules
The rules for the 2020 WWE draft were revealed by Fox Sports on October 8, which were the same as the previous draft in October 2019. Over 60 male and female wrestlers, as well as individual tag teams and stables, including current champions, were placed into the 2020 drafting pools. Over 20 wrestlers were announced as being eligible to be drafted on the October 9 episode of SmackDown and more than 30 wrestlers were eligible to be drafted on the October 12 episode of Raw. The rules of the draft were as follows:
Due to the length of each show, for every two picks made by SmackDown, Raw received three (as SmackDown is two hours and Raw is three).
Tag teams and stables counted as one pick unless either broadcast partner (Fox and NBCUniversal), in conjunction with WWE, wanted to specifically pick one wrestler from the group.
Any undrafted wrestlers were immediately (in kayfabe) declared free agents and were able to sign with the brand of their choosing.

Draft pool

Night 1: SmackDown (October 9)
There were four rounds of draft picks during Night One of the 2020 draft. WWE Chief Brand Officer (CBO) Stephanie McMahon announced the draft picks for each.

Notes
One stable was split up as a result of the first night: Big E remained on SmackDown while his New Day stablemates, Kofi Kingston and the returning Xavier Woods, were drafted to Raw, temporarily taking the SmackDown Tag Team Championships with them (they would later trade the titles over to The Street Profits (Angelo Dawkins and Montez Ford) moments after the then-Raw Tag Team Champions were drafted to SmackDown during Night Two to resolve any confusions).
One tag team was split up as a result of the draft: Otis remained on SmackDown while his Heavy Machinery tag team partner, Tucker, was drafted to Raw during the supplemental draft on Talking Smack the following day.

Supplemental picks: Talking Smack (October 10)
A supplemental draft took place on Talking Smack with wrestlers who were not drafted on Night 1.

Notes
One stable was split up as a result of the supplemental draft: Kalisto remained on SmackDown while his Lucha House Party stablemates, Gran Metalik and Lince Dorado, were drafted to Raw.

Night 2: Raw (October 12)
There were six rounds of draft picks during Night Two of the 2020 draft. WWE's CBO Stephanie McMahon again announced the draft picks for each.

Supplemental picks: Raw Talk (October 12)
A supplemental draft took place on Raw Talk with wrestlers who were not drafted on Night 2.

Post-draft trades

Free agents
Several wrestlers were made free agents due to injury, inactivity, or not being drafted during their draft pool. The chart is organized by date.

Aftermath
During Night 1 of the draft, The New Day's Kofi Kingston and Xavier Woods won the SmackDown Tag Team Championship. Immediately after their win, they were drafted to Raw, splitting Big E from The New Day as Big E remained on SmackDown; this also resulted in Kingston and Woods taking SmackDown's tag titles to Raw. However, on Night 2 of the draft, Raw Tag Team Champions The Street Profits (Angelo Dawkins and Montez Ford) were drafted to SmackDown. Later that night, WWE official Adam Pearce had the two teams trade titles to keep the branded championships on their respective brands, thus New Day became the Raw Tag Team Champions and Street Profits became the SmackDown Tag Team Champions.

For several months prior to the draft, Seth Rollins and his disciple Murphy had been feuding with the Mysterios (Rey Mysterio and Dominik Mysterio). After Rollins was drafted to SmackDown, he had thought that was the end of their feud; however, the Mysterios, as well as Murphy, were also drafted to SmackDown. The feud continued over the following month, which also saw Rey's daughter Aalyah get involved romantically with Murphy, who turned on Rollins to join with the Mysterios.

In early September, The Miz and John Morrison began a feud with Otis over Otis' Money in the Bank contract. Although drafted to separate brands, the feud continued and Otis was scheduled to defend the contract against The Miz at Hell in a Cell on October 25, where Miz defeated Otis to win the Money in the Bank contract.

For a couple of months prior to the draft, then-SmackDown wrestler Drew Gulak got involved in segments over the 24/7 Championship on pay-per-view as well as episodes of Raw, where he won the title a couple of times. After Gulak was drafted to Raw, he continued pursuing the 24/7 Championship. Shortly after his drafting to Raw, Matt Riddle's ring name was shortened to Riddle. Just the same on SmackDown, Shorty G returned to using his original ring name, Chad Gable. Also, despite being drafted to Raw, Arturo Ruas made no post-draft appearances on Raw and was returned to NXT the following month. Similarly, although Dabba-Kato had been drafted to Raw, he did not make a single appearance on the brand after the draft. His first post-draft appearance came during Night 2 of WrestleMania 37 on April 11, 2021, where he helped Apollo Crews win the Intercontinental Championship. Dabba-Kato was subsequently transferred to the SmackDown brand where Crews introduced him under his new ring name, Commander Azeez.

During Night 2 of the draft, after both Elias and Jeff Hardy had been drafted to Raw, Elias made his first on-screen appearance in five months and attacked Hardy, as Elias believed it was Hardy who caused him to miss the previous five months. Back in May, Hardy was involved in a feud with Sheamus, who tried exploiting Hardy's past issues with alcohol. During one segment, Elias was hit with a car outside of the WWE Performance Center, which Sheamus tried to frame on Hardy. Upon Elias' return during the draft, he believed that Hardy was not framed and did in fact hit him with the car. The two then feuded over the next few weeks.

Due to the COVID-19 pandemic, which resulted in less work for wrestlers as WWE was now only doing television and pay-per-view and ceased touring, many talent took to third-party platforms such as Twitch, Cameo, and YouTube to earn supplemental income. In September, WWE issued a statement to their talent that they could no longer use these platforms, and gave the talent 30 days to close down their accounts or face fines, suspension, or termination; it was later clarified that talent could not use their ring names or characters for these other platforms, but they must get permission from WWE in order to use the platforms. Some talent, such as Paige and Zelina Vega, took opposition to this, and expressed their support of a wrestler's union. Vega was then released by WWE on November 13, allegedly because of her opposition to the company's policy on using third-party platforms and her support of unionization. In mid-2021, however, Vega was rehired, making her return as an in-ring competitor on the July 2 episode of SmackDown where she was entered into the women's Money in the Bank ladder match.

Although Steve Cutler and Wesley Blake were signed to SmackDown in December 2020 and aligned with King Corbin as "The Knights of the Lone Wolf," this teaming would not last long as Cutler was released from his WWE contract in February 2021. King Corbin also reverted to his original Baron Corbin ring name in June 2021 after he lost his King of the Ring crown to Shinsuke Nakamura. In August 2021, Corbin declaring himself "filthy rich" and changed his new ring name to Happy Corbin.

The January 4, 2021 special "Legends Night" episode of Raw would also be Big Show's final appearance in WWE, as on February 19, he was moved to the alumni section on WWE.com and he then signed with rival promotion All Elite Wrestling under his real name, Paul Wight, on February 24. Big Show was reportedly unhappy in WWE and they were not able to come to terms on a new agreement following his appearance at Legends Night.

Following WrestleMania 37 in April 2021, many other wrestlers, a couple of which were still listed as "free agents," were released from their WWE contracts. These included Samoa Joe, Billie Kay, Peyton Royce, Mickie James, Chelsea Green, Tucker, Kalisto, Mojo Rawley, Bo Dallas, and Wesley Blake. On May 19, NXT wrestlers Jessamyn Duke and Vanessa Borne were released, followed by Velveteen Dream the next day. On June 2, further releases were made, which included Braun Strowman, Aleister Black, Lana, Murphy, Ruby Riott, and NXT's Santana Garrett. Joe, however, was re-signed by the company and made his return on the June 15 episode of NXT, becoming a special enforcer and assistant to NXT General Manager William Regal. Further NXT and 205 Live names were released on June 25, including Tony Nese, Ariya Daivari, Breezango (Tyler Breeze and Fandango), Ever-Rise (Chase Parker and Matt Martel), August Grey, The Bollywood Boyz (Samir Singh and Sunil Singh), Arturo Ruas, Curt Stallion, Marina Shafir, and Killian Dain. On July 31, Bray Wyatt was released from his contract; however, he returned in October 2022 and was assigned to the SmackDown brand.

Notes

References

WWE Draft
WWE draft
2020 WWE draft
Professional wrestling in Orlando, Florida
October 2020 events in the United States